Sindhupalchowk District (or Sindhupalchok) is a part of Bagmati Province and one of the seventy-seven districts of Nepal, with an area of . The district's headquarters is in Chautara. In 2006, 336,478 people resided in 79 village development committees, in 2011 there were 287,798.

Geography 
The climatic zones found in the district comprise:

Demographics
At the time of the 2011 Nepal census, Sindhupalchowk District had a population of 287,798. Of these, 53.3% spoke Nepali, 32.7% Tamang, 5.9% Newari, 2.7% Sherpa, 1.7% Hyolmo/Yolmo, 1.2% Danuwar, 1.1% Thami, 0.3% Gurung, 0.2% Maithili,, 0.2% Majhi, 0.1% Magar, 0.1% Pahari, 0.1% Tibetan and 0.2% other languages as their first language.

In terms of ethnicity/caste, 34.4% were Tamang, 18.1% Chhetri, 11.1% Newar, 10.3% Hill Brahmin, 3.9% Kami, 3.6% Sanyasi/Dasnami, 2.6% Sherpa, 2.3% Majhi, 1.9% Damai/Dholi, 1.7% Magar, 1.7% Thami, 1.7% Yolmo, 1.5% Sarki, 1.3% Danuwar, 1.0% Gurung, 0.9% Gharti/Bhujel, 0.7% Pahari, 0.2% Ghale, 0.2% Thakuri, 0.1% Bhote, 0.1% foreigners, 0.1% Jirel and 0.3% others.

In terms of religion, 59.0% were Hindu, 38.0% Buddhist, 1.8% Christian, 1.1% Prakriti and 0.1% others.

In terms of literacy, 59.3% could read and write, 2.9% could only read and 37.7% could neither read nor write.

Administration
The district consists of 12 Municipalities, out of which three are urban municipalities and nine are rural municipalities. These are as follows:

Chautara Sangachowkgadi
Bahrabise
Melamchi
Balephi Rural Municipality
Sunkoshi Rural Municipality
Indrawati Rural Municipality
Jugal Rural Municipality
Panchpokhari Thangpal Rural Municipality
Bhotekoshi Rural Municipality
Lisankhu Pakhar Rural Municipality
Helambu Rural Municipality
Tripurasundari Rural Municipality

Former towns and villages
Prior to the restructuring of the district on January, 2013, the major towns were khadichaur,Chautara, Bahrabise, Melamchi, Jalbire and Tatopani.

Andheri
Atarpur
Bhotang
Badegau
Bansbari
Banskharka
Baramchi
Bahrabise municipality
Balephi
Baruwa
Batase
Bhimtar
Bhote Namlang
Bhotechaur
Bhotsiba
Chanaute
Choukati
Chautara Municipality
Dhumthang
Dubarchaur 9
Gati
Ghorthali
Dhuskun
Gloche
Gumba
Gunsakot
Hagam
Haibung
Helambu
Ichok
Irkhu
Jalbire
Jethal
Jyamire
Kalika
Karkhali
Kadambas
Khadichaur
Kiul
Kunchok
Lamosanghu
Langarche
Lisankhu
Listikot
Mahankal
Maneshwara
Manekharka
Marming
Melamchi municipality
Motang
Nawalpur
Pagretar
Palchok
Pangtang
Petaku
Phatakshila
Phulping Katti
Phulpingdanda
Phulpingkot
Piskar
Ramche
Sangachok
Selang
Sikharpur
Simpani-Kubinde
Sindhukot
Sipa Pokhare
Sipal Kavre
Sunkhani
Syaule Bazar
Talamarang
Tatopani
Tauthali
Tekanpur
Thakani
Thampal Chhap
Thangpalkot
Thokarpa
Thulo Dhading
Thulo Pakhar
Thulo Sirubari
Thum Pakhar
Timpul Ghyangul
Yamanadanda

Education
There are more than half a dozen colleges offering bachelor's degrees in Sindhupalchok. More than 25 schools are running  programs. There are generally one or more high schools in each VDC within Sindhupalchok. Chautara Campus, Thokarpa Community Campus, Sunkoshi Campus, and Jalbire Valley Campus are some leading educational institutions. Higher-level education is only available in Chautara, Bahrabise, Kavre and Kathmandu.

There are more than 25 private schools in the district. These include Sadabahar Academy (established in 2063 BS), Ekta Boarding High School (established in 2050 BS), Jugal Boarding High School (established in 2047 BS), Ketu English School, Nirvana Academy, Chandeswari English School and Private Paradise Secondary School.

Newspaper and magazines

There are more than 10 newspapers that publish news from the district and several monthly magazines, which have played a vital role in providing immediate news and information to the people in printed format. Sindhusandesh (सिन्धुसन्देश) is one of the oldest local newspapers.
Sindhu Sandesh Weekly (सिन्धुसन्देश साप्ताहिक) Editor: Suresh kasaju, Bihanee Times Weekly (विहानी टाईम्स साप्ताहिक) Editor: Sundar Shireesh, Sindhu Jagaran Weekly (सिन्धु जागरण साप्ताहिक) Editor: Bidur Giri, Okhereni Weekly (ओखरेनी साप्ताहिक) Editor: Sitaram Ghimire, Sindhu Prabaha Weekly (सिन्धुप्रवाह साप्ताहिक) Editor: Dinesh Thapa, Nayapani Sandesh Weekly (नयाँपानी सन्देश साप्ताहिक) Editor: Kedar Majhi, Sindhu Jwala Weekly (सिन्धुज्वाला साप्ताहिक) Editor: Dinesh Dulal, Janata Patra Weekly (जनतापत्र साप्ताहिक) Editor: Tika Subedhi, Sindhu Post Weekly (सिन्धु पोष्ट साप्ताहिक) Editor: Ramchandra Nepal, Sindhu Bulanda Weekly (सिन्धुबुलन्द साप्ताहिक) Editor: Chitra Mijar, Sindhu Yatra Monthly (सिन्धु यात्रा) Editor: Gyanendra Timalsina, Spandan Gunjan Literature Magazine (स्पन्दन गुञ्जन साहित्यिक त्रैमासिक) Editor: Sundar Shireesh . 
There are Three Online Media. www.jugalkhabar.com (जुगल खबर) Editor: Sundar Shireesh, www.sindhukhabar.com (सिन्धु खबर) Editor: Bhupendra Bhandari, www.newsaraniko.com (न्यूज अरनिको) Editor: Naniram Nepal. 
Five Radio also broadcast.  Radio Sindhu, Radio Helambu, Radio Melamchi, Radio Sunkoshi and Radio Jugal.

Health care

Following is the data obtained from the PHASE Nepal website:

Central/regional/zonal hospitals: 0
District hospitals: 1
Primary healthcare centres: 2
Health posts: 11
Sub-health posts: 65
Number of doctors: 6
Number of nurses: 95

Although there is a district hospital as well as primary healthcare centers, this is not enough for providing health services. The small health centers in many VDCs are without Auxiliary Health Workers (AHWs), Auxiliary Nurse Midwives (ANMs) and Community Health Workers (CHWs). So, people seeking emergency health assistance have to travel long distance to major centres or Kathmandu, or end up dying because of lack of treatment. Many people still believe in Dhami and Jhakri and are against taking medicine or going to hospital for treatment.

An NGO, PHASE Nepal, provides many healthcare facilities and training programs in two VDCs: Phulpingkot and Hagam. Many people residing in these VDCs have benefited from the program.

Tourism 

Cultural heritage sites in the district include the Gaurati Bhimeshwor temple, the Tauthali Mai temple, the Sunkoshi Kafeshwar Mahadev temple, the Kshemadevi temple, and Larke Ghyang, which are popular for pilgrims. Tatopani (Hot Water Spring), near the China–Nepal border, is popular as a pilgrimage location. Bhairav Kunda and Panch-Pokhari are popular trekking destinations with religious and cultural significance.

Sun Koshi and Bhote Koshi rivers are famous for rafting. Bungy jumping over the Bhote Koshi river is another attraction.

Although it is one of the least developed, this district can be one of the finest tourist destinations, attracting both national and international tourists. The tourist attractions of this district include Langtang National Park, Langtang Himal, Jugal Himal, Panch Pokhari, Tato Pani, and Gaurati Bhimeswar.

Similarly AMAYANGRI Peak located in Helambu Rural Municipality is also a finest tourist destination.

Arts and culture

Notable entertainers from the district include actors Shree Krishna Shrestha (1967–2014) , Sunita Dulal and Jeetu Nepal, and singer Raju Lama.

2015 earthquake
Several aftershocks were reported in the region. There were also fears that the earthquake, or aftershocks, could trigger further flooding or landslides such as in 2014.

Steep mountains and narrow roads in the Sindhupalchok District drastically slowed rescue efforts. It took vehicles three hours to arrive from Kathmandu. Electricity and communication were cut off across in the district, so residents were isolated. Of the 66,688 houses in the district, 64,565 (96.8%) were destroyed.
As of 23 August 2015, more than 3,550 people were recorded to have died in the district as a result, and thousands of people were injured, of which 614 were sent to Kathmandu for treatment. Over 40 people were rescued from debris, and more than 3,000 people were still missing; resulting the extremely hard hit district by this devastating earthquake.

A UH-1Y Huey helicopter delivering relief supplies crashed in Sindhupalchowk District about eight miles north of Charikot, with six US Marines and two Nepalese soldiers aboard.

See also
Thangmi language

References

External links

Merosindhu.com : Sindhupalchok District
Sukute Beach Resort 
Helambu
Bhairav Kunda
Sindhusandesh (सिन्धुसन्देश)

 
Districts of Nepal established in 1962
Bagmati Province
Districts of Bagmati Province